Mlibizi is a village on the southern shore of Lake Kariba. Mlibizi is situated in Matabeleland North province in Zimbabwe. Mlibizi is a popular fishing resort amongst the white community and is the terminal of the Kariba Ferries car and passenger ferry.

Mlibizi Aerodrome 
A single untarred runway exists outside the camp for use with light aircraft.

Kariba Ferries 
Kariba Ferries is a company that operates car and passenger ferries from Kariba town to Mlibizi. In recent years their services have been disrupted but as of dollarisation in Zimbabwe they have resumed regular operations

References 

Populated places in Matabeleland North Province